In linguistics, grammatical person is the grammatical distinction between deictic references to participant(s) in an event; typically the distinction is between the speaker (first person), the addressee (second person), and others (third person). A language's set of personal pronouns are defined by grammatical person, but other pronouns would not. First person includes the speaker (English: I, we, me, and us), second person is the person or people spoken to (English: you), and third person includes all that are not listed above (English: he, she, it, they, him, her, them). It also frequently affects verbs, and sometimes nouns or possessive relationships.

Related classifications

Number

In Indo-European languages, first-, second-, and third-person pronouns are typically also marked for singular and plural forms, and sometimes dual form as well (grammatical number).

Inclusive/exclusive distinction

Some other languages use different classifying systems, especially in the plural pronouns. One frequently found difference not present in most Indo-European languages is a contrast between inclusive and exclusive "we": a distinction of first-person plural pronouns between including or excluding the addressee.

Honorifics

Many languages express person with different morphemes in order to distinguish degrees of formality and informality. A simple honorific system common among European languages is the T–V distinction. Some other languages have much more elaborate systems of formality that go well beyond the T–V distinction, and use many different pronouns and verb forms that express the speaker's relationship with the people they are addressing. Many Malayo-Polynesian languages, such as Javanese and Balinese, are well known for their complex systems of honorifics; Japanese, Korean, and Chinese also have similar systems to a lesser extent.

Effect on verbs

In many languages, the verb takes a form dependent on the person of the subject and whether it is singular or plural. In English, this happens with the verb to be as follows:
 I am (first-person singular)
 you are/thou art (second-person singular)
 he, she, one, it is (third-person singular)
 we are (first-person plural)
 you are/ye are (second-person plural)
 they are (third-person plural)

Other verbs in English take the suffix -s to mark the present tense third person singular, excluding singular 'they'.

In many languages, such as French, the verb in any given tense takes a different suffix for any of the various combinations of person and number of the subject.

Additional persons

The grammar of some languages divide the semantic space into more than three persons. The extra categories may be termed fourth person, fifth person, etc. Such terms are not absolute but can refer depending on context to any of several phenomena.

Some Algonquian languages and Salishan languages divide the category of third person into two parts: proximate for a more topical third person, and obviative for a less topical third person. The obviative is sometimes called the fourth person. In this manner, Hindi and Bangla may also categorize pronouns in the fourth, and with the latter a fifth person.

The term fourth person is also sometimes used for the category of indefinite or generic referents, which work like one in English phrases such as "one should be prepared" or people in people say that..., when the grammar treats them differently from ordinary third-person forms. The so-called "zero person" in Finnish and related languages, in addition to passive voice may serve to leave the subject-referent open. Zero person subjects are sometimes translated as "one," but the problem with that is that English language constructions involving one, e.g. "One hopes that will not happen," are rare and could be considered expressive of an overly academic tone to the majority of people, while Finnish sentences like "" ("Not allowed to touch") are recognizable to and used by young children in both languages.

English personal pronouns in the nominative case

See also

Grammar
 English personal pronouns
 Gender-neutral pronoun
 Gender-specific pronoun
 Generic antecedents
 Generic you
 Grammatical conjugation
 Grammatical number
 Illeism
 Personal pronoun
 Singular they
 Verb

Works
 First Person Plural, a book by Cameron West.
 Second Person Singular, a book by Sayed Kashua.
 Third Person Singular Number, a film by Mostofa Sarwar Farooki.
 Third Person Plural, a film directed by James Ricketson and starring Bryan Brown.

References

External links

 
 

Grammatical conjugation
Grammatical categories